The University of St. Gallen (HSG) is an elite public research university located in St. Gallen, Switzerland that specialises in business administration, economics, law, and international affairs. Established in 1898, it consistently ranks among the best business schools in the world and counts as the top one in the German speaking world. In 2020, it had 9,047 students, of which 3,443 were master's students and 617 doctoral students.

Although one of Switzerland's smallest universities, HSG has Switzerland's largest faculty for business administration. It is a member of the CEMS and APSIA and is EQUIS, AACSB and AMBA accredited (triple crown). Its campus is listed as a Swiss heritage site of national significance.

History

19th and 20th centuries
In May 1898, the Cantonal Parliament of St. Gallen established an academy for trade, commerce and administration in St. Gallen. The actual founding father is considered to be Theodor Curti, then the head of the Department of Economic Affairs of the Canton of St. Gallen. The business academy commenced lectures in 1899, making it one of the first institutions of its kind in the world. From 1911 on, the name Handels-Hochschule was used. In 1938, the former foundation under private law became a public institution, and in 1939 gained the right to award doctoral degrees.

In 1963, the university moved to new buildings and changed its name to Hochschule für Wirtschafts- und Sozialwissenschaften. The new buildings were planned for 900 students, but by the winter term of 1963/64, more than 1150 students were enrolled. With the enaction of the Higher Education Act of 1989, the university was renamed Hochschule St. Gallen für Wirtschafts-, Rechts- und Sozialwissenschaften to reflect its curricula. The university has had its own law department since 1978. In 1989, the library building opened, and enrollment had grown to over 3900. In February 1994, the Cantonal Parliament of St. Gallen approved a bill to amend the Higher Education Act, leading to the renaming of the institution as Universität St. Gallen (University of St. Gallen). The acronym HSG remained.

Recent history
In winter 2001/02, the University of St. Gallen started the reorganization of its study programs. Education was classified into bachelor's and master's degrees, making the university Switzerland's pioneer in the Bologna process. In October 2005, the university's Executive School of Management, Technology and Law (ES-HSG) was opened. The financially autonomous Executive School centralizes further educational activities such as MBA and executive MBA programs.

Mid-2005, the people of St. Gallen voted (with 66.4% in favour) to renovate, reorganize and expand the university by 2011. With a budget of about 80m Swiss francs, buildings from the 1960s were renovated, and its infrastructure was updated.

Campus

The University of St. Gallen is located atop Rosenberg hill, overlooking the picturesque Altstadt of St. Gallen, with a view of the Alpstein mountain range. The campus is noted for its integration of art and architecture.

In the Main Building, designed by Walter Foerderer and regarded worldwide as a significant example of 1960s architecture, art is a major feature of the architecture; whereas in the Library Building of 1989, works of art complement the diversity of architectural forms in a narrative fashion. There are works by Burckhardt, Mastroianni, Kemény, Penalba, Arp, Braque, Hajdu, Soniatta, Miró, Calder, Soulages, Giacometti, Tàpies, Coghuf, Valentin, Otto Müller, Stahly, Baier, Bodmer, Oertli, Gehr, Gubler, Prantl, Baumgarten, Disler, Bill, Josef Felix Müller, Paladino, Richter, Fabro, and Cucchi.

The area around the university, including the town of St. Gallen at Lake Constance and the Alps, offers facilities for outdoor activities including skiing, hiking, climbing and sailing.

In 1995, a convention and executive education center opened a few minutes’ walk from the main campus. Extended in 2007, it now comprises several plenary halls and 54 business rooms. The university also has international hubs in Singapore and São Paulo to connect local faculty, students, alumni and companies with its academic activities.

In 2019, the voters of the canton of St. Gallen approved the construction of an additional campus in the city. The new campus will create room for 3,000 additional students and will be opened in 2027.

In February 2022, the new HSG Learning Center "SQUARE" will open on the Rosenberg. It is intended to be an innovative place for thinking and working, enabling new types of learning and interaction between students, faculty and people from the field. The project is being realised by the HSG Foundation and financed entirely through donations. Over 800 donors have supported the HSG Learning Center to date. The project "Open Grid - Choices of Tomorrow" by Sou Fujimoto Architects won the architecture competition in 2018.

Academics

Schools, institutes, and research centers

Following a restructuring in 2011, there are five schools at the University of St. Gallen: the School of Management (SoM-HSG), the School of Finance (SoF-HSG), the Law School (LS-HSG), the School of Economics and Political Science (SEPS-HSG), and the School of Humanities and Social Sciences (SHSS-HSG). Study programs are typically associated with a specific school but are taught jointly by faculty members from several schools. The Executive School of Management, Technology and Law (ES-HSG) plays a special role which has the status of an Institut mit besonderen gesamtuniversitären Aufgaben and which runs the MBA and executive education programs.

The crystallization points of research at the University of St. Gallen are about 40 institutes and research centres, which are an integral part of the university. The directors of the institutes double as professors of the University of St. Gallen. Bringing theory and practice together, the institutes provide an important input for teaching at the university and play a significant role in furthering the careers of young academics. 80 tenured professors, 60 assistant professors and senior lecturers, and more than 300 lecturers and 300 assistants, plus distinguished visiting professors cultivate the scientific discourse with the students.

The University of St. Gallen is a member of the European Research Center for Information Systems (ERCIS) and the Auto-ID Labs network.

Study programs

A new structure of Studies became operational as of winter 2001/2002. Degrees are now divided into Bachelors, Masters, and Doctoral programs in accordance with the Bologna Process. Courses at the Bachelor level are typically taught in German, while many Master's programs and most Doctoral programs are taught in English. Since 2013, the bachelor's degree programs has started with an assessment year for all students. The assessment year was introduced in two separate tracks (German/English) in order to improve the teacher/student ratio.  Upon successful completion of this year, students can then choose one of five majors for their remaining two years of study as listed below. The majority of Bachelor students are enrolled in Business Administration. Besides the University of St. Gallen, only the University of Geneva offers an International Affairs program within Switzerland. The Master's programs cover the same range of studies, but are more specialized. The Masters programs typically run from 1.5 to 2 years. Besides the CEMS Master's in International Management, further double degrees may be obtained in cooperation with partner universities such as Bocconi University, ESADE, HEC Paris, INCAE Business School, Nanyang Technological University, The Fletcher School of Law and Diplomacy, Rotterdam School of Management, or Sciences Po Paris.

Rankings

*In 2016, CEMS refused to take part in the yearly FT Ranking. The program made its comeback in 2017 at the 9th place.

Student life

The University of St. Gallen hosts 25% international students, an upper limit which has been fixed by the government.

There are about 80 clubs at the University of St. Gallen. Particularly well-known is the International Students' Committee, an organization which plans and coordinates the annual St. Gallen Symposium. Since 1970, the St. Gallen Symposium has brought together leaders from business, science, politics and society with students from all over the world. AIESEC St. Gallen is a club that was founded in 1951 and that provides an international internship program. The largest club at the University of St. Gallen and the largest of its kind in Switzerland is the Helvetian Investment Club, a finance-focused career club with over 1,450 members. One of the largest clubs with more than 600 members is DocNet, the doctoral students' club at the University of St. Gallen. Founded in 2001, a major event of DocNet is the annual DocNet Management Symposium. A chapter of Oikos International, a student organization for sustainable development, also plays an active role at the University of St. Gallen. Other clubs are mostly sports clubs, cultural clubs, or associations of students of different countries or cantons, subject-specific clubs related to specializations at the University of St. Gallen as well as fraternities.

The official organization of former students of the University of St. Gallen is HSG Alumni. With more than 19,000 members and 80 alumni clubs on 4 continents, it is one of Europe's leading associations of its kind. Since 1930, the club has been reinforcing the alumni's lifelong bonds with the university, as well as the networks among its members, by means of numerous events and information platforms.

Notable people

Alumni

Notable University of St. Gallen alumni in the financial sector include Deutsche Bank Chairman Paul Achleitner, former Deutsche Bank CEO Josef Ackermann, former Commerzbank CEO Martin Blessing, Swiss Re Honorary Chairman Walter Kielholz, former Julius Baer Group CEO Alex Widmer, former UBS CEO Peter Wuffli, current N26 CEO and founder Valentin Stalf. Business leaders in other sectors who attended the University of St. Gallen include Daimler AG CEO Ola Källenius, Swatch Group CEO Nick Hayek, Jr., IWC CEO Georges Kern, Qiagen CEO Peer M. Schatz, former Fresenius SE CEO and Nestlé CEO Ulf Mark Schneider, Thomas Cook Group CEO, Peter Fankhauser, and BASF board member Margret Suckale. In the intellectual space, notable alumni include novelist and bestselling author Rolf Dobelli. In the field of law and politics, notable alumni include Swiss politician and former President of the Swiss Council of States Christoffel Brändli, Sovereign Monarch and Head of State of Liechtenstein Prince Hans-Adam II, Swiss politician Hans-Rudolf Merz, Swiss politician and Stadler Rail CEO Peter Spuhler, Swiss politician Heinz Indermaur, as well as Adrian Hasler Prime Minister of Liechtenstein, and Klaus Tschütscher, former Prime Minister of Liechtenstein.

 Thomas Aeschi businessman and politician 
 Judith Sarah Jäger Bellaiche  politician

Faculty and staff

Notable current or former faculty members of the University of St. Gallen include the Advocate General of the Court of Justice of the European Union Juliane Kokott, corporate communication professor Miriam Meckel, arts director Sir Peter Jonas, Walter Hunziker, developer of Tourism Science, and Ota Šik, Professor of Economics and one of the key figures in the Prague Spring.

Controversies
Following a 2019 investigation by the cantonal audit office, the University of St. Gallen came under heavy criticism for the frivolous spending behaviour in some of its institutes. Representatives of the cantonal legislature called for a change in the university's culture of accountability.

In 2021, a professor at the University of St. Gallen ended her supervisor agreement with a temporarily deregistered doctorate student, and had the university delete his email account, for making a negative comment on Twitter about China's communication during the beginning of the Covid-19 crisis.

Partner universities 
University of St. Gallen has partnership agreements and cooperations with various universities, including the following:

 Aalto University School of Business
 Columbia University
 Copenhagen Business School
 Chinese University of Hong Kong
 University of Virginia
 Cornell University
 Dartmouth College
 Duke University
 Emory University
 ESADE
 ESSEC Business School
 Hong Kong University of Science and Technology
 HEC Paris
 IE University
 INCAE Business School
 Imperial College London
 Andrássy University Budapest
 Instituto de Empresa
 Keio University
 London School of Economics and Political Science
 Manchester Business School
 McGill University
 National University of Singapore
 New York University
 Northwestern University
 Peking University
 Sciences Po
 Seoul National University
 Stockholm School of Economics
 Tsinghua University
 Bocconi University
 University of Hong Kong
 Universidad de los Andes
 University of Melbourne
 University of Navarra
 Université Paris-Dauphine
 University of Sydney
 University of California, Los Angeles
 University of Southern California
 University of Chicago
 University of Michigan
 University of Toronto
 Warwick Business School
 Yonsei University
 Nanyang Technological University

See also
List of largest universities by enrollment in Switzerland
List of modern universities in Europe (1801–1945)

Bibliography

References

External links

University of St. Gallen website

 
Buildings and structures in St. Gallen
Schools in the canton of St. Gallen
Economics schools
Educational institutions established in 1899
1899 establishments in Switzerland
Cultural property of national significance in the canton of St. Gallen